Marie Jacobsson (born 26 October 1964) is a former synchronized swimmer from Sweden.

References 

1964 births
Living people
Swedish synchronized swimmers
Olympic synchronized swimmers of Sweden
Synchronized swimmers at the 1988 Summer Olympics
Sportspeople from Linköping
Sportspeople from Östergötland County